Daniel Kjell Valter Erik Örlund (born 23 June 1980) is a Swedish former footballer who played as a goalkeeper. He is best remembered for his time with AIK and Rosenborg. He won one cap for the Sweden national team.

Club career

He began his career at senior level at local club Spårvägen before signing for AIK in 2002. Örlund made his debut in AIK in a Svenska Cupen game against Carlstad United in 2003. AIK won with 4-1, and Örlund kept the goalkeeper position in the next cup round against Häcken as well. During the 2004 season he was on loan to FC Café Opera United where he made an impressive impact (25 games with seven clean sheets). At his return to AIK in 2005, while playing in Superettan, Örlund played all but one game and made himself a streak, when he did not let in a goal for 567 minutes. Since his return to AIK he has been the undisputed first choice and helped the club win the 2009 Allsvenskan and 2009 Svenska Cupen. On 27 November 2009 he signed for Rosenborg BK. Örlund left Rosenborg BK after his contract expired after the 2014 season. On 2 March 2015, it was announced by HJK Helsinki that they had signed Örlund.

International career 
He made his first and only international appearance for the Sweden national team on 20 January 2010 in a friendly game against Oman, keeping a clean sheet in a 1-0 win. He was on the bench for a UEFA Euro 2012 qualifier in 2010 and for a 2014 FIFA World Cup qualifier in 2013, but never appeared in a competitive game for Sweden.

Post-playing career 
In 2017, Örlund was appointed goalkeeping coach of Djurgårdens IF Fotboll (women).

Honours

Club 

Fredrikstad
 Norwegian Premier League runner up:  2008

AIK
 Allsvenskan: 2009
 Svenska Cupen: 2009

Rosenborg BK
Norwegian Premier League Championship: 2010

References

External links

Brommapojkarna profile

Living people
1980 births
Footballers from Stockholm
Swedish footballers
Association football goalkeepers
AIK Fotboll players
AFC Eskilstuna players
Fredrikstad FK players
Rosenborg BK players
Helsingin Jalkapalloklubi players
IF Brommapojkarna players
Allsvenskan players
Superettan players
Eliteserien players
Swedish expatriate footballers
Expatriate footballers in Norway
Sweden international footballers
Enskede IK players
Association football goalkeeping coaches
Djurgårdens IF Fotboll (women) non-playing staff